Before the Republic of India was established on 26 January 1950, all Indian subjects of the princely states and Indian rulers were entitled to substantive knighthoods (the Order of the Star of India and the Order of the Indian Empire). Those Indian rulers who received other British orders of knighthood were only considered honorary members of those orders.

The following is a partial list of honorary British knighthoods as given to Indian rulers and members of the ruling families up to 1947 (the Orders of the Star of India and the Indian Empire are considered substantive). Rulers of states that are presently part of Pakistan are included in this article. 

The order moves from the most prestigious states (21-guns) to least prestigious (9-guns):

21-gun salute

Hyderabad
Mir Mahbub Ali Khan - GCB (1902)
Asaf Jah VII - GBE (1917)
Azam Jah - GBE (1943)

Mysore
Krishnaraja Wodeyar IV - GBE (1917)
Jayachamarajendra Wodeyar - GCB (1946)

Jammu and Kashmir
Ram Singh - KCB (1895)
Partab Singh of Kashmir - GBE (1918)
Hari Singh - GCVO (1946), KCVO (1922)
Khanbhadur Akram Ali Khan. - GBE (1940)
Gwalior
Jayajirao Scindia - GCB (1877)
Madho Rao Scindia - GCVO (1902), GBE (1917)

19-gun salute

Bhopal
Sultan Kaikhusrau Jahan Begum - GBE (1917)

Kolhapur
Shahu IV - GCVO (1903)

17-gun salute

Kotah
Umed Singhji II - GBE (1918)

Bahawalpur (now Pakistan)
Sadeq Mohammad Khan V - KCVO (1922)

Bikaner
Ganga Singh - GCVO(1919), GBE (1921), KCB (1918)

Cutch
Vijayaraji - GBE (1945)

Jodhpur
Sumair Singh - KBE (1918)
Umaid Singh - KCVO (1922)

Patiala
Bhupinder Singh - GCVO (1922), GBE (1918)
Yadavindra Singh - GBE (1942)

15-gun salute

Dholpur
Udaybhanu Singh - KCVO (1922)

Dhar
Udajirao II - KCVO (1922), KBE (1917)

Idar
Pratap Singh of Idar - GCB (1918), KCB (1901), GCVO (1911)

Rampur
Hamid Ali Khan Bahadur - GCVO (1911)

Swat (now part of Pakistan) 
Abdul Wadud - KBE (1930)

13-gun salute

Kapurthala
Jagatjit Singh Bahadur - GBE (1927)

Nawanagar
K.S. Ranjitsinhji - GBE (1919)

Ratlam
Sajjan Singh - KCVO (1922)

Jaora
Muhammad Ifthikar Ali Khan Bahadur - GBE (1937)

Palanpur
Taley Muhammad Khan Bahadur - KCVO (1922)

Rajpipla
Vijaysinhji Chhatrasinhji - GBE (1945)

Tripura
Bir Bikram Kishore - GBE (1946)

11-gun salute

Assam

Hiralal Phukan -1917(A.D.)

Received Order of British India First Class in Delhi Durban.

Narendra Nath Phukan -1941

For fighting courageous in the Second World War. And, also received the Indian Recruiting Badge.

Morvi
Lakhdhiraji Waghji - GBE (1939)

Narsingarh
 Jodhpuriji Shri Huzur Rani Bapu Shiv Kanwarji Sahiba, Rani of Narsingarh - DBE (1924)

The Aga Khan

As a religious head, the Aga Khan is not a monarch per se, but until 1947 merited a 13-gun salute

Aga Khan III-GCMG, GCVO
Aga Khan IV-KBE (2003)

Political Pensioners

Those ruling families had lost ruling rights by the 20th century.

Murshidabad (entitled to a 19-gun personal salute)
Nawab Sayyid Wasif Ali Mirza Khan-KCVO (1912)

Sources

British honours system